Kholeh Kahush, also known as Kholeh Gush, may refer to:
 Kholeh Kahush-e Olya
 Kholeh Kahush-e Sofla